Capitol Hill Baptist Church is a Baptist church located on Capitol Hill in Washington, D.C., six blocks from the United States Capitol. It is affiliated with the Southern Baptist Convention. Mark Dever serves as the senior pastor of the church, where he also runs his ministry 9Marks teaching principles of "healthy church" practices.

History
It was founded in 1878 and was originally named Metropolitan Baptist Church, after the Metropolitan Tabernacle in London., although the naming origins are refuted by some. It was later named Capitol Hill Metropolitan Baptist Church, to differentiate it from another Metropolitan Baptist Church in the District of Columbia. It was subsequently shortened to be named Capitol Hill Baptist Church.

Senior pastors prior to Dever included:
John Compton Ball;
Walter Pegg;
K. Owen White (one time president of the Southern Baptist Convention, early proponent of conservative theological fundamentalism in the Southern Baptist Convention, and later pastor at First Baptist Church, Houston, Texas);
J. Walter Carpenter (later pastor at Kendall Baptist Church, Washington, DC);
R. B. Culbreth;
Harold Lindsell (interim) who was also Editor of Christianity Today;
John Stuckey (later a United Methodist Church pastor);
C. Wade Freeman Jr. (who also served as trustee at Southwestern Baptist Theological Seminary);
Dynamic, theologically conservative preaching was a pulpit trademark during most of the early 20th century, Metropolitan/Capitol Hill Metropolitan Baptist Church years;
Walter S. Tomme, Jr. (later pastor / founder of Tysons Community Church). 

CHBC is affiliated with the Southern Baptist Convention, and has been described as the "epicenter of the new Calvinism". The average age of its members is 31.

CHBC emphasizes the need for a regenerate church membership, and has implemented a church covenant to that end.

Although conservative, Capitol Hill Baptist Church supports the practice of having female deacons.

References

Further reading

External links

Baptist churches in Washington, D.C.
Religious organizations established in 1878
Southern Baptist Convention churches